The Friends is a 1971 French drama film directed by Gérard Blain. The film won the Golden Leopard at the Locarno International Film Festival.

Plot

Paul (Yann Favre), a 16-year-old aspiring actor, has an affair with Philippe (Philippe March), a married and very wealthy businessman. The two go on a trip to Deauville in Philippe's sports car and check into a luxury hotel.

Paul, who is from a comparatively poor family, makes friends with the rich young people in Deauville. Thanks to Philippe's financial support, he can afford nice clothes, but there are other giveaways that he is not from a rich family himself, e.g. his inability to ride a horse, so he takes lessons. To fit in better with the rich kids, Paul invents a fake background story for himself, where Philippe's occupation and wealth stand in for his real (and divorced) father. When Paul and Philippe later meet the Deauville rich kids in a bar, Paul introduces Philippe as his godfather and a friend of his supposedly wealthy family.

A few days later, Philippe has to return to Paris for business. Paul would like to stay in Deauville for a little longer and gets some more money from Philippe. Paul starts an affair with Marie-Laure (Nathalie Fontaine), but unlike his warm and loving relationship with Philippe, his fling with Marie-Laure only consists of sex and ends when Marie-Laure dumps him for another young man.

After Philippe dies in a car accident, Paul is alone again, with Nicolas (Jean-Claude Dauphin), the only real friend he made in Deauville and who suspected the nature of the relationship between Paul and his "godfather" Philippe, accompanying him to the cemetery to watch Philippe's burial from afar.

Cast
 Philippe March as Philippe
 Yann Favre as Paul
 Jean-Claude Dauphin as Nicolas
 Nathalie Fontaine as Marie-Laure
 Dany Roussel as La mère de Paul
 Claude Larcher as Béatrice
 Hélène Zanicolli as Monique (as Hélène Zanicoli)
 Christian Chevreuse as Maître Manège
 Martin Pierlot as Jean-Marc
 Liliane Valais as La mère de Marie-Laure
 Vincent Gauthier as Olivier
 Sylvie Delanoë
 Jean-Claude Holzen as Richard
 Dominique Oudard as Le groom

References

External links
 

1971 films
1971 LGBT-related films
1971 drama films
French drama films
1970s French-language films
Golden Leopard winners
Films directed by Gérard Blain
Films scored by François de Roubaix
1970s French films
French LGBT-related films